The maroon-naped sunbird (Aethopyga guimarasensis) is a species of bird in the family Nectariniidae. It is endemic to the Philippines (Negros Island, Panay and Guimaras). Its natural habitat is subtropical or tropical moist lowland forests.

References

maroon-naped sunbird
Birds of Negros Island
Birds of Panay
maroon-naped sunbird
maroon-naped sunbird